Hibbertia dispar is a species of flowering plant in the family Dilleniaceae and is endemic to eastern Australia. It is a prostrate to low-lying shrublet with hairy, linear leaves and yellow flowers arranged on the ends of branchlets, usually with four to six stamens in a cluster on one side of two carpels.

Description
There are usually four to six stamens arranged in a bundle on one side of the two (rarely three) hairy carpels, each carpel usually with four ovules. Flowering mainly occurs from September to November.

Taxonomy
Hibbertia dispar was first formally described in 2013 by Hellmut R. Toelken in the Journal of the Adelaide Botanic Gardens from specimens collected by Alexander Clifford Beauglehole near Boisdale in 1973. The specific epithet (dispar) means "unlike", referring to the species' unusual characteristics.

Distribution and habitat
This hibbertia grows in a range of habitats but often on rocky slopes or along creeks. It is found on the Central Tablelands of New South Wales, in Gippsland, Victoria and on some Tasmanian islands.

See also
List of Hibbertia species

References

dispar
Flora of New South Wales
Flora of Victoria (Australia)
Plants described in 2013
Taxa named by Hellmut R. Toelken